Rubroboletus eastwoodiae, or satan's bolete, is a toxic basidiomycete fungus of the bolete family.  It occurs on the West Coast of the United States. It is closely related to Rubroboletus pulcherrimus.

The mushroom turns blue with bruising. The cap is 10–25 cm wide, convex, olive-colored, pinkish in age, dry, has margin that curves inward then expands, and yellowish flesh. The stalk is 7–15 cm tall and 3–6 cm wide. The spores are olive-brown, elliptical, and smooth. It may be poisonous.

It looks similar but is not conspecific with the European species Rubroboletus satanas. It is also similar to Boletus pulcherrimus and B. amygdalinus.

References

eastwoodiae
Fungi of the United States
Fungi without expected TNC conservation status